Back to the Future is a 1985 science fiction film and was the first film in the popular American science-fiction film franchise.

Back to the Future may also refer to:

Film and television 
 Back to the Future (franchise)
 Back to the Future Part II, the 1989 sequel to Back to the Future
 Back to the Future Part III, the 1990 sequel film to Back to the Future Part II
 Back to the Future: The Ride, the 1991 theme park simulator ride sequel to Back to the Future Part III
 Back to the Future (TV series), a 1991 French-American TV series
 Back to the Future: The Musical, the 2020 musical adaptation of Back to the Future
 Ivan Vasilievich: Back to the Future, a 1973 Soviet film, unrelated to the Back to the Future franchise
 "Back to the Future (Not the Movie)", the 2006 series finale to the American science fiction sitcom Phil of the Future, unrelated to the Back to the Future franchise

Music

Albums 
 Back to the Future soundtracks, a list of soundtrack albums from the franchise
 Back to the Future, a 2008 album by Phoenix & Mony Bordeianu
 Back to the Future, a 1999 album by Willie Rosario 
 Back to the Future, a 2013 album by Big Daddy Kane
 Back to the Future: The Very Best of Jodeci, a Jodeci album
 Back to the Future Now: Live at Arizona Charlie's, a country album by Asleep at the Wheel 1997
 Back to the Future, a jazz album by Andrea Centazzo
 Back to the Future, a 2005 jazz album by Anthony Coleman

Songs 
 "Back to the Future", a song on Dru Hill's 2010 album InDRUpendence Day
 "Back to the Future", a song by Diana Ross compiled on 1993 Forever Diana: Musical Memoirs

Video games 
 Back to the Future, a 1985 video game based on the film of the same name
 Back to the Future, a 1989 video game based on the film of the same name
 Back to the Future Part II & III, a 1990 video game based on the second and third films in the Back to the Future trilogy
 Back to the Future: The Game, a 2010 video game based on the Back to the Future franchise, and direct sequel to Back to the Future Part III